Bunn's short-tailed bandicoot rat (Nesokia bunnii) is a species of rodent in the family Muridae.
It is found only in the marshes of southeastern Iraq and is named for the Iraqi zoologist Dr. Munir K. Bunni.

References

Nesokia
Endemic fauna of Iraq
Mammals described in 1981
Taxonomy articles created by Polbot